Laurence Andrew "Lol" Tolhurst (born 3 February 1959) is a founding member and the former drummer and keyboardist of English band The Cure - he left the Cure in 1989 and was later involved in the band Presence and his current project, Levinhurst. In 2011, he was temporarily reunited with the Cure for a number of shows playing the band's earlier work. 

He published his memoir in 2016, Cured: The Tale of Two Imaginary Boys. The book related his childhood in Crawley and his journey within the Cure.

Life and career

Early years (1959–1975)
Tolhurst was born in Horley, in the county of Surrey, England, the fifth of six children of William and Daphne Tolhurst; he has three brothers (Roger, Nigel and John) and two sisters (Jane and Barbara). Tolhurst was five years old when he first met Robert Smith at St. Francis Primary and Junior Schools, and thus began a friendship that culminated in the formation of The Cure.

The Cure (1976–1989)
Tolhurst was one of the co-founders of English rock band The Cure, and was the band's drummer from 1976, playing on the albums Three Imaginary Boys, Seventeen Seconds, Faith and Pornography. After the Pornography tour in 1982, he became the band's keyboardist. In 1989, during the recording of the Cure's eighth studio album, Disintegration, Tolhurst was asked to leave the band by Robert Smith due to alcohol and narcotic use adversely affecting his professional reliability. Despite receiving a credit for "other instrument" on Disintegration, the other members of the band have said that Tolhurst did not play on the album.

After The Cure (1990–2010)
Following his departure from the Cure, Tolhurst and Gary Biddles—who previously worked with Simon Gallup in Fools Dance—formed the short-lived band Presence, which released only one full-length album at the time called Inside in 1993. He said several years later that he had recorded a second album with this band, but the album, entitled Closer, would not be released until 2014, a year after Biddles' death. In 1991, Tolhurst's first son was born in London, poet and musician Gray Andrew Tolhurst. In 1994, Tolhurst sued Robert Smith and Fiction Records over royalty payments, also claiming joint ownership, with Smith, of the name The Cure. He eventually lost after a long legal battle. He has worked as a producer for the debut album of And Also the Trees.

In the early 2000s, Tolhurst and his second wife, Cindy Levinson, formed a band called Levinhurst. A few months before the release of their debut album, Tolhurst said in an interview that he had reconciled with Robert Smith and that the two were friends again. Shortly afterward, Levinhurst released their debut album, Perfect Life, in 2004. Since then, they have released an EP called The Grey featuring a cover of The Cure's "All Cats are Grey"—for which he claimed credit for writing the lyrics—and two other songs. Their second album, House by the Sea, was released in April 2007. Their third album, called Blue Star and featuring original Cure bassist Michael Dempsey, was released in the U.S. in June 2009 and worldwide in February 2010. Tolhurst also composed music for the film 9,000 Needles, a documentary that won Best Documentary at the 2010 Phoenix Film Festival. The second part of the European tour, "Blue Star Over Europe", occurred in October 2010, followed by a South and North American tour in early 2011.

Reunion shows with the Cure (2011)
In 2010, The Guardian published an article with a headline reading "The Cure's original drummer asks to rejoin band." However, Tolhurst called the article "a little misleading", saying:
I have not asked RS to rejoin the Cure! I have my thing, he has his. I just thought it might be fun to play the old songs together again especially as Michael and I had a great time playing the TIB songs this March in Europe.

In 2011, it was announced that Tolhurst would return to performing with the Cure for the first time in 22 years when the band performed their first three albums—Three Imaginary Boys, Seventeen Seconds and Faith in their entirety at the Sydney Opera House in Australia. Tolhurst then performed with the Cure for seven more shows in London, New York and Los Angeles later that same year.

Post-reunion shows (2011–present)
Tolhurst published his memoir in 2016, Cured: The Tale of Two Imaginary Boys. He tells of his time with the band between 1976 and 1989. Tolhurst, who has known Robert Smith since his childhood, says the band were like his family. Tolhurst undertook an extensive book tour, beginning in the United Kingdom and finishing in the U.S. In 2018, Tolhurst featured in an episode of the BBC Radio 4 series Soul Music, in which he discussed the history of the song "Boys Don't Cry".

In October 2021, Tolhurst and Budgie started a podcast called Curious Creatures, in which they explore "post punk’s enduring legacy and contemporary relevance" along with invited guests. The second season started in March 2022: a new episode is uploaded every week on streaming platforms.

Personal life
Shortly after leaving the Cure in 1989, Lol Tolhurst met Cindy Levinson in Hollywood where Levinson was working as a hairdresser.

Levinson and Tolhurst were married and in 2002, they formed the band Levinhurst. The couple live in California and have one child.   Tolhurst's son, Gray Tolhurst, is a guitarist/songwriter in the band Topographies.

Discography
 With the Cure
 Three Imaginary Boys (1979)
 Seventeen Seconds (1980)
 Faith (1981)
 Happily Ever After (1981 compilation album)
 Pornography (1982)
 Japanese Whispers (1983)
 The Top (1984) 
 Concert: The Cure Live (1984)
 The Head on the Door (1985)
 Standing on a Beach (1986)
 Kiss Me, Kiss Me, Kiss Me (1987)
 Disintegration (1989) (songwriting only)
 Galore (1997)
 Greatest Hits (2001)
 Join the Dots: B-Sides & Rarities 1978–2001 (The Fiction Years) (2004)
With Presence
→ See Presence discography
With Levinhurst
→ See Levinhurst Discography

References

External links
Official website

Lol Tolhurst Interview - NAMM Oral History Library (2016)

1959 births
British expatriates in the United States
British rock trumpeters
Male trumpeters
The Cure members
Levinhurst members
English rock keyboardists
English rock drummers
English new wave musicians
English memoirists
Living people
People from Horley
British male drummers
New wave drummers